Daniel Kent McCready (born July 18, 1983) is an American veteran, entrepreneur, civil rights activist, and former political candidate from Charlotte, North Carolina. He served in the United States Marine Corps, achieving the rank of captain.

McCready was the Democratic Party nominee for the United States House of Representatives from North Carolina's 9th congressional district in the 2018 election. Initially it appeared that Republican Mark Harris won narrowly. The bipartisan state election board completed an investigation into allegations of ballot fraud by Republican operatives and declined to certify the election and called for a special election to fill the seat. McCready lost the special election to Dan Bishop on September 10, 2019.

Early life and education 
McCready is from Charlotte, North Carolina, and graduated from Myers Park High School in the Charlotte-Mecklenburg Schools system. He earned a bachelor's degree in economics from Duke University in 2005. He then served as a captain in the United States Marine Corps and was deployed to Iraq in 2007 and 2008, where he led two platoons. Following his military service, he returned to university for graduate work, earning a Master of Business Administration (MBA) from Harvard Business School.

Career
After earning his MBA in 2011, McCready worked for a year as a management consultant for McKinsey & Company. He left the company in 2013 to cofound Double Time Capital, a solar-focused clean energy fund, with partner Rye Barcott. As of February 2017, "Double Time has financed 36 solar energy projects, which collectively produce roughly 10% of North Carolina's solar power and power around 30,000 homes in the state." At that time, North Carolina was the second ranked state in the United States based on the cumulative amount of solar electric capacity installed.

In 2014, McCready founded This Land, an online store for American crafts that highlighted the work of skilled craftspeople from economically depressed areas who otherwise do not have the means to market their products to broad audiences. In 2017, McCready announced that he would be closing the site in order to focus on his campaign for US House of Representatives.

2018 U.S. House of Representatives election
 
On May 8, 2018, McCready easily won the Democratic Party primary election while former pastor Mark Harris unseated incumbent representative Robert Pittenger in the Republican primary. The New York Times described the race between Harris and McCready as a "top-tier contest". A CBS News story called the race "one of the most competitive". On election day, unofficial vote tallies showed Harris defeating McCready by 905 votes, but on November 27, 2018, the North Carolina State Board of Elections and Ethics Reform declined to certify the election results, citing voting irregularities involving absentee ballots in the eastern part of the district. The irregularities became the subject of a criminal investigation into an alleged ballot harvesting scheme to elect the Republican Harris. It was orchestrated by Republican political operative McCrae Dowless in Bladen and Robeson Counties.

The Associated Press subsequently retracted calling the race, pending the ultimate decision of the state board of elections. On November 30, the election board of the district decided to hear evidence about "claims of numerous irregularities and concerted fraudulent activities" at a meeting to be held by December 21, which was subsequently delayed to January 10, 2019, after the new Congress was scheduled to be seated. McCready withdrew his earlier submitted concession on December 6. In February 2019, the bipartisan election board unanimously determined they would not certify the results because of ballot fraud by Republican operatives. They called for a special election to be held. The state legislature passed a law requiring new party primaries.

2019 U.S. House of Representatives special election

The election board called a special election to be held for this congressional seat. A newly passed law by the North Carolina General Assembly requires such a do-over to include the holding of new preceding primaries for the parties. McCready filed to run in the special election. McCready's major party opposition was Republican State Senator Dan Bishop. The election was held on September 10.

During the election, President Donald Trump claimed that McCready "wants to take away your guns", "raise your taxes", "likes open borders", and "really admires socialism." CNN described Trump's claims as comprehensively inaccurate, as McCready advocates for tax cuts for the middle class, does not advocate for taking guns away, and supports physical barriers on the border.

On September 10, 2019, Bishop won the 2019 special election to Congress with 50.7% of the vote to McCready's 48.7%.

Personal life 
Dan McCready is the husband of Laura Thornhill McCready, a children's attorney. They met while students at Duke on a backpacking trip. They have four children.

References

External links

 Dan McCready for Congress 

North Carolina Democrats
Businesspeople from North Carolina
Living people
1983 births
Duke University Trinity College of Arts and Sciences alumni
Harvard Business School alumni
Politicians from Charlotte, North Carolina
21st-century American politicians
Candidates in the 2018 United States elections
Candidates in the 2019 United States elections